The 1975 Finnish motorcycle Grand Prix was the tenth round of the 1975 Grand Prix motorcycle racing season. It took place on the weekend of 25–27 July 1975 at the Imatra Circuit.

500cc classification

References

Finnish motorcycle Grand Prix
Finnish
Motorcycle Grand Prix